Akinoshū Kenji (born 17 January 1969 as Kenji Imada) is a former sumo wrestler from Hiroshima, Japan. He made his professional debut in September 1984, and reached the top division in September 1997. His highest rank was maegashira 9. He left the sumo world upon retirement in January 2001.

Career record

See also
List of sumo tournament second division champions
Glossary of sumo terms
List of past sumo wrestlers

References

External links

1969 births
Living people
Japanese sumo wrestlers
Sumo people from Hiroshima Prefecture
Sportspeople from Hiroshima